Sicradiscus is a genus of gastropods belonging to the family Plectopylidae.

The species of this genus are found in Eastern Asia.

Species:

Sicradiscus cutisculptus 
Sicradiscus diptychia 
Sicradiscus feheri 
Sicradiscus hirasei 
Sicradiscus invius 
Sicradiscus ishizakii 
Sicradiscus mansuyi 
Sicradiscus schistoptychia 
Sicradiscus securus 
Sicradiscus transitus

References

Gastropods